Austrochloritis ascensa is a species of gastropod in the family Camaenidae. It is endemic to Australia.

References

Gastropods of Australia
ascensa
Gastropods described in 1943
Taxonomy articles created by Polbot